Angel Ginev (born 24 December 1976) is a Bulgarian footballer. He plays as a defender.

Ginev previously played for FF Jaro in Finnish premier division and for Rodopa Smolyan in the Bulgarian first division. Ginev is a central defender.

References

1976 births
Living people
Bulgarian footballers
Bulgarian expatriate footballers
Expatriate footballers in Finland
PFC Rodopa Smolyan players
FF Jaro players
FC Lyubimets players
FC Dunav Ruse players
PFC Ludogorets Razgrad players
Veikkausliiga players
First Professional Football League (Bulgaria) players
Association football defenders
People from Haskovo
Sportspeople from Haskovo Province